Allium sinaiticum is a species of flowering plant in the Amaryllidaceae family. It is a wild onion found in sandy areas in Israel, Sinai, Palestine, Jordan and Saudi Arabia. It is a small, bulb-forming perennial; flowers have white tepals with green midveins.

References

sinaiticum
Onions
Plants described in 1854
Taxa named by Pierre Edmond Boissier